The Toyota Celica Turbo is a race car, designed, developed and produced by Toyota, in collaboration and partnership with All-American Racers, for the IMSA GTO class of the IMSA GT Championship, between 1986 and 1988. A total of 3 models were built.

References 

Grand tourer racing cars
Celica Turbo IMSA GTO